Forrest Gander (born 1956) is an American poet, translator, essayist, and novelist. The A.K. Seaver Professor Emeritus of Literary Arts & Comparative Literature at Brown University, Gander won the Pulitzer Prize for Poetry in 2019 for Be With and is chancellor of the Academy of American Poets and a member of the American Academy of Arts and Sciences.

Early life
Born in Barstow, California, Forrest Gander grew up in Virginia, where he and his two sisters were raised by their single mother, an elementary school teacher. The four shared a two-room apartment in Annandale. Gander's estranged father ran The Mod Scene, a bar on Bleecker Street in Greenwich Village, New York City. With his mother and sisters, Gander began to travel extensively on summer road trips around the United States. The traveling, which never stopped, came to inform his interest in landscapes, languages, and cultures. Forrest and his two sisters were adopted by Walter J. Gander soon after Walter Gander's marriage to their mother, nee Ruth Clare Cockerille. Gander earned a B.S. in geology from the College of William and Mary and an M.A. in creative writing from San Francisco State University.

Career 
A writer of multiple genres, Gander is noted for his many collaborations with other artists, including Eiko & Koma. He is a United States Artists Rockefeller Fellow and the recipient of fellowships from the Library of Congress, the National Endowment for the Arts, the John Simon Guggenheim Foundation, The Whiting Foundation, and the Howard Foundation. In 2017, he was elected as a Chancellor to the Academy of American Poets and in 2019, he was awarded The Pulitzer Prize in poetry.

He taught at Providence College and at Harvard University before becoming the Adele Kellenberg Seaver Professor of Literary Arts and Comparative Literatures at Brown University in Providence, Rhode Island.

Writing and translation

David Kirby, writing in The New York Times Book Review notes that, "It isn't long before the ethereal quality of these poems begins to remind you of similar effects in the work of T. S. Eliot and the 17th century Anglo-Welsh mystic Henry Vaughan....In the midst of such questioning, the only reality is the poet's unflinchingly curious mind." Noting the frequency and particularity of Gander's references to ecology and landscape, Robert Hass, former U.S. Poet Laureate, calls him "a Southern poet of a relatively rare kind, a restlessly experimental writer." Gander's book Core Samples from the World was a finalist for 2012 Pulitzer Prize and the 2011 National Book Critics Circle Award. The Pulitzer citation notes that Core Samples from the World is "a compelling work that explores cross-cultural tensions in the world and digs deeply to identify what is essential in human experience." With Australian poet-activist John Kinsella, Gander wrote the cross-genre book Redstart: an Ecological Poetics.

Be With, published in 2018 by New Directions, was awarded the 2019 Pulitzer Prize in poetry and was longlisted for the 2018 National Book Award. It is an elegiac collection of poetry and testament to his anguish over the death of his wife. Gander eventually decided to stop reading publicly from the collection so as not to "perform his grief."

The subjects of Gander's formally innovative essays range from snapping turtles to translation to literary hoaxes. His critical essays have appeared in The Nation, Boston Review, and The New York Times Book Review.

In 2008, New Directions published As a Friend, Gander's novel of a gifted man, a land surveyor, whose impact on those around him provokes an atmosphere of intense self-examination and eroticism. In The New York Times Book Review, Jeanette Winterson praised As a Friend as "a strange and beautiful novel.... haunting and haunted." As a Friend has been published in translation in half a dozen foreign editions. In 2014, New Directions released Gander's second novel The Trace, about a couple who, researching the last journey of Civil War writer Ambrose Bierce, find themselves lost in the Chihuahua Desert. The New Yorker called it a "carefully crafted novel of intimacy and isolation." In The Paris Review, Robyn Creswell commented "Gander's landscapes are lyrical and precise ("raw gashed mountains, gnarly buttes of andesite"), and his study of a marriage on the rocks is as empathetic as it is unsparing."

Gander is a translator who has edited several anthologies of poetry from Spain, Mexico, and Latin America. In addition, Gander has translated distinct volumes by Mexican poets Pura López Colomé, Coral Bracho (for which he was a PEN Translation Prize finalist for Firefly Under the Tongue), Valerie Mejer Caso, and Alfonso D'Aquino, another poet connected with ecopoetry. With Kyoko Yoshida, Gander translated Spectacle & Pigsty: Selected Poems of Kiwao Nomura, winner of the 2012 Best Translated Book Award; in 2016, New Directions published Alice Iris Red Horse, selected poems of Yoshimasu Gozo, edited by Gander. The second book of his translations, with Kent Johnson, of Bolivian poet Jaime Saenz, The Night (Princeton, 2007), received a PEN Translation Award. Gander's critically acclaimed translations of the Chilean Nobel Laureate Pablo Neruda are included in The Essential Neruda: Selected Poems (City Lights, 2004).

In 2016, Copper Canyon Press released "Then Come Back: the Lost Neruda," a bilingual edition of Gander's translations of twenty previously unknown and unseen Neruda poems.

In 2018, Gander became a reviewer with New York Journal of Books.

Collaborations and editorial work
Gander has worked with artists Ann Hamilton and Gus Van Sant, photographers Lucas Foglia, Sally Mann, Graciela Iturbide, Peter Lindbergh, Michael Flomen, and Raymond Meeks, ceramics artists Ashwini Bhat and Richard Hirsch, dancers Eiko & Koma, painter Tjibbe Hooghiemstra, glass artist Michael Rogers, musicians Vic Chesnutt and Brady Earnhart, and others.

Along with CD Wright, Gander was a co-editor of Lost Roads Publishers for twenty years, soliciting, editing, and publishing books by more than thirty writers, including Michael Harper, Kamau Brathwaite, Arthur Sze, Fanny Howe, Steve Stern, Josie Foo, Frances Mayes, and Zuleyka Benitez.

Personal life 
Gander was married to poet CD Wright. Together the couple raised a son. Wright's sudden death in 2016 precipitated Gander's book Be With.

Gander lives now in Northern California. He is married to the artist Ashwini Bhat.

Selected publications
Poetry collections
 Knot (Copper Canyon, 2022) 
 Twice Alive (New Directions, 2021) 
 Be With (New Directions, 2018) 
 Eiko & Koma (New Directions, 2013). , 
 Core Samples from the World (New Directions, 2011). , 
 Eye Against Eye (New Directions, 2005). , 
 The Blue Rock Collection (Salt Publishing, 2004). , 
 Torn Awake (New Directions, 2001). , 
 Science & Steepleflower (New Directions, 1998). 
 Deeds of Utmost Kindness (Wesleyan University Press, 1994). 
 Lynchburg (University of Pittsburgh Press, 1993). 
 Rush to the Lake (Alice James Books, 1988).  

Chapbooks
 A Sonnet of Mudras with Ashwini Bhat (Literarium, Third Man Books, 2021). 
 Eggplants and Lotus Root (Burning Deck Press, 1991). , 

Novels
 The Trace (New Directions, 2014). , 
 As a Friend (New Directions, 2008). 

Collaborative works
 Redstart: An Ecological Poetics (University of Iowa Press, 2012) collaboration with John Kinsella. , 
 Las Canchas (Blue Star Contemporary, 2009), collaboration with photographer Daniel Borris.
 Twelve X 12:00 (Philip Elchers, 2003), collaboration with artist Tjibbe Hooghiemstra.
 Sound of Summer Running (Nazraeli Press, 2005), collaboration with photographer Raymond Meeks.

Essay collections
 A Faithful Existence: Reading, Memory and Transcendence (Counterpoint, 2005). 

In translation
Essere Con. Italian translation of Be With. (Benway Series, Italy, 2020).
Bądź Blisko. Polish translation of Be With. (Lokator,Kraków, 2020).
Poesie Scelte. Italian translation of poems from Be With. (La Camera Verde, Rome, 2019).
Beckoned. Chinese translation of poems from Be With. (The Chinese University of Hong Kong Press, Hong Kong, 2019).
Estar Con. Spanish translation of Be With. (Mangos de Hacha, Mexico City, 2019).
Está Con. Spanish translation of Be With. (Libros de la resistencia, Madrid, 2019).
Eiko & Koma. Japanese translation of Eiko & Koma. (Awai LLC, Tokyo, 2019).
İz. Turkish translation of The Trace. (Yapi Kredi Yayinlari, Ankara, 2019).
El Rastro. Spanish translation of The Trace. (Sexto Piso, Mexico City & Barcelona, 2016).
Le Trace. French translation of The Trace. (Sabine Wespieser Editeur, Paris, 2016).
Eiko & Koma y otros poemas. Spanish translation of selected poems. (Libros Magenta, Mexico D.F., 2016).
Şairin Vedasi. Turkish translation of As a Friend. (Yapi Kredi Yayinlari, Ankara, 2019).
Como Amigo. Spanish translation of As a Friend. (Sexto Piso Editorial, Mexico City & Barcelona, 2013).
Ligaduras. A work of selected poems in Spanish translation. (Ventana Abierta Editorial, Santiago, Chile, 2011).
Als es dich gab. Roman. German translation of As a Friend. (Luxbooks, Wiesbaden, Germany, 2010).
Libreto para eros. A work of selected poems in Spanish translation. (Amargord, Madrid, 2010).
En Ami. French translation of As a Friend. (Sabine Wespieser Editeur, Paris, 2010).
Като приятел. Bulgarian translation of As a Friend. (Altera, Sofia, Bulgaria, 2010).

Translations
 Names & Rivers by Shuri Kido (Copper Canyon, 2022) with Tomoyuki Endo. 
 It Must Be a Misunderstanding by Coral Bracho (New Directions, 2022). 
 Dylan and the Whales by Maria Baranda, The New World Written: Selected Poems (Yale University Press, 2021). 
 The Galloping Hour: French Poems by Alejandra Pizarnik (New Directions, 2018) with Patricio Ferrari. 
 Then Come Back : the Lost Neruda Poems (Copper Canyon Press, 2016) , 
 Alice Iris Red Horse: Selected Poems of Gozo Yoshimasu (New Directions, 2016). 
 Berlin: Stories by Aleš Šteger (Counterpath Press, 2015) with Brian Henry & Aljaž Kovac.
 Rain of the Future: Poems by Valerie Mejer Caso edited by CD Wright (Action Books, 2014). 
 fungus skull eye wing: selected poems of Alfonso D'Aquino (Copper Canyon, 2013). 
 Watchword, by Pura Lopez Colome (Wesleyan University Press, 2012). 
 Spectacle & Pigsty: Selected Poems of Kiwao Nomura (Omnidawn, 2011) with Kyoko Yoshida. 
 Firefly Under the Tongue: Selected Poems of Coral Bracho (New Directions, 2008). 
 The Night: A Poem by Jaime Saenz (Princeton University Press, 2007) with Kent Johnson. , 
 No Shelter: Selected Poems of Pura Lopez Colome (Graywolf Press, 2002). 
 Immanent Visitor: Selected Poems of Jaime Saenz (University of California Press, 2002) with Kent Johnson. 

Anthologies edited
 Pinholes in the Night: Essential Poems from Latin America Selected by Raúl Zurita (Copper Canyon, 2013). 
 Panic Cure: Poems from Spain for the 21st Century (Seismicity Editions in USA; Shearsman Editions in UK, 2013). 
 Connecting Lines: New Poetry from Mexico (Sarabande Books, 2006). , 
 Mouth to Mouth: Poems by Twelve Contemporary Mexican Women (Milkweed Editions, 1993). ,

Awards and honors
National Endowment for the Arts Fellowship in poetry (1989, 2001)
 Gertrude Stein Award in Innovative North American Poetry (1997, 1993)
 Whiting Foundation Award, 1997
 Jessica Nobel Maxwell Memorial Prize (from American Poetry Review, 1998)
 Pushcart Prize, 2000
 PEN Translation Fund Grant from PEN American Center, 2004
 Howard Foundation Award, 2005
 Guggenheim Foundation Fellowship, 2008
 United States Artists Rockefeller Fellowship, 2008
 Library of Congress Witter Bynner Fellowship, 2011
 Best Translated Book Award 2012
 National Book Critics Circle Award Finalist, 2011
 Pulitzer Prize Finalist, 2012
 National Book Award Longlist 2018
 Pulitzer Prize for Poetry 2019

Archives
The Forrest Gander papers at Yale University's Beinecke Library cover Gander's full writing life, and additions to the collection are regularly made by the author.

References

External links

 Forrest Gander Papers. Yale Collection of American Literature, Beinecke Rare Book and Manuscript Library.
Profile at The New Yorker by Dan Chiasson
 'Paul Magee Interviews Forrest Gander' in Cordite Poetry Review
 Author Website
Profile at The Whiting Foundation
 Review of Core Samples from the World by Justin Wadland at Rain Taxi
 Brown University > Forrest Gander Resume
 Brown University > Comparative Literature Faculty > Forrest Gander
 Audio: Gander reading at the Key West Literary Seminar in 2003
 Author Bio: Jacket Magazine
 The Nymph Stick Insect: On Poetry, Science, & Evolution
 Poem: Conjunctions Issue 44/Spring 2005 > Mission Thief > By Forrest Gander
 Great American Pinup on Eye Against Eye
 Audio: The East Village Poetry Web
 Video: Gander Reading and Lecture at U. of Chicago, 2006
Audio: "Lichen Doesn't Die," interview on the Poetry Off the Shelf podcast, 2019.

Novelists from Virginia
Writers from Rhode Island
Brown University faculty
1956 births
Living people
Iowa Writers' Workshop faculty
College of William & Mary alumni
21st-century American novelists
American male novelists
National Endowment for the Arts Fellows
21st-century American poets
American male poets
21st-century American translators
American male essayists
21st-century American essayists
Novelists from Iowa
Translators of Pablo Neruda
San Francisco State University alumni
21st-century American male writers